Gender inequality has been improving a lot in Bangladesh, inequalities in areas such as education and employment remain ongoing problems so women have little political freedom. In 2015, Bangladesh was ranked 139 out of 187 countries on the Human Development Index and 47 out 144 countries surveyed on the Gender Inequality Index in 2017. Many of the inequalities are result of extreme poverty and traditional gender norms centred on a patrilineal and patriarchal kinship system in rural areas.

Gender
Bangladesh is one of those countries of the world where the number of men exceeds the number of women. Ninety- percent of the population adheres to Islam. Veiling remains a domain of contestation in regards to whether it serves as a vehicle of empowerment or discrimination. While seen in Western discourse as restrictive of women's rights, some claim that burkas allow for better freedom of movement in Bangladesh. Despite the changes that have come with the demand for women in the export industry, women are generally unseen outside the domestic sphere. This is especially true in rural Bangladesh. While labour force increase has accounted for higher percentages for females than males, terms of equality are measured in various areas beyond employment. Their status and position is also measured in terms of education, income, assets, health, and the role they play in the family and in society. These characteristics are representative of the amount of political power and social prestige a woman is accorded and thus the extent to which she can influence decision-making within the home and in the community.

Legal status

Although the Constitution of Bangladesh states that women have equal footing with men in all spheres of public life, it also recognizes religious personal laws, which are unequal to women. Four significant events in the life of a woman: marriage; divorce; custody of children; and, inheritance rights are governed by personal laws. Personal laws are based on religious and social value systems. Because women are the primary caregivers for children, in cases of divorce, custody is most often awarded to the mother. 

In recent years, several laws have been put in place to reduce the amount of violence against women and girls. Early in 2011, a Division Bench of the High Court Division of the Supreme Court ordered every incident of eve-teasing to be considered sexual harassment. It also ordered an amendment to the Prevention and of Repression on Women and Children Act of 2000 to include the act of stalking in its provisions. Other laws protecting Bangladeshi women include the Acid Crime Control 2002 and the Dowry Prohibition Act 1980. However, weak enforcement of these laws is common due to a weak judiciary, corruption, and societal tolerance.

The Convention on the Elimination of all forms of Discrimination Against Women (CEDAW)

In 1979, the United Nations General Assembly adopted CEDAW as an international bill of rights for women. It defines what constitutes discrimination against women and creates an agenda for states to end discrimination worldwide. States that ratify CEDAW are legally bound to put its provisions into practice and are obligated to submit national status reports every 4 years

On 6 November 1984, Bangladesh ratified CEDAW with reservations on Articles 2, 13.1[a], 16.1[c], and [f] due to conflicts with Sharia law of Islam. Since ratification, Bangladesh has undergone milestone changes in gender equality. In 2009, a public interest litigation case brought by the Bangladesh National Women's Lawyers Association challenged the High Court to step in and take action as there was no national law against sexual harassment. CEDAW became the centre of the Court's deliberations, and particular interest in CEDAW's Article 11 on equality in employment and the CEDAW Committee's General Recommendation no. 19 on violence against women was given. Based on these principles, the Court issued sexual harassment guidelines for the whole country, which will remain when legislation is passed. Bangladesh has also used CEDAW to help attain gender parity in primary school enrollment and has as a goal for 2015, to eliminate all gender disparities in secondary education.

Health

In 2011, 24% of births were attended by a professional health physician. Sex selective health care and infanticide suggest a correlation between the number of females to males in Bangladesh. In Europe where men and women are given similar health care and nutrition, women outnumber men 105:100. In Bangladesh, that ratio is 95:100. In terms of the population, that ratio accounts for approximately 5 million missing women. Economist Amartya Sen argues that this low ratio is primarily due to insufficient health care provided for young girls but nowadays NGOs are encouraging equal health care. He reported that men, followed by boys, is the largest group of people admitted into hospitals. Women family members are less likely to receive modern medical care and are generally recipients of traditional remedies.

The health situation for urban women is worse than that for rural women, especially those living in slums. The urban population living in the slum areas do not have adequate sanitation, water and health facilities which results in poor health.

Education

In 2011, the population with at least a secondary education was 30.8% for women and 39.3% for men. Due to poverty, literacy rates have remained low. In the span of 30 years (1970 to 2000), the female-male literacy ratio has more than doubled, from 0.30 to 0.61. While levels remain low, there is a more rapid increase of educational attainment for women than men. Enrollment of girls are rising in schools and colleges. However, due to financial constraints and the lack of earning opportunities for educated women, the rationale in the Bangladesh family to educate a boy over a girl still persists. Other impediments to educational attainment for women include early marriage, cultural norms, and religious orthodoxy. Participation in technical disciplines (regarded as men's domain) in areas such as engineering and agriculture is unequal as well. As of 1997, the student population at technical universities is only 9% female.

Employment

Labor force participation for females has been driven primarily by the growth of approved export industry jobs in textiles and the spread of micro financing operations by NGOs including the Grameen Bank. Women's participation in high skill, managerial, and government executive positions have increased only to a limited extent. Income inequalities between women and men are still existent in Bangladesh. The 2012 Human Development Report shows that in the small business sector, for every dollar earned by a male, women make 12 cents in comparison. Over time, however, gender earning gaps have decreased in favour of women.

Microcredit

Since the 1970s, microcredit institutions in Bangladesh have moved to the centre stage of most poverty alleviation schemes.  The most notable micro finance institutions in Bangladesh are the Grameen Bank and BRAC. (Bangladesh Rural Advancement Committee) In 2005, these two institutions covered 59% of total microcredit borrowers in Bangladesh. Marketization of the originally intended welfare oriented sector have made micro finance widely popular, accounting for a $2.1 billion industry.  These loans require no collateral, making for attractive prospects to poor and/or rural Bangladeshi families who have no collateral to offer.

Bangladeshi women are primarily who these institutions target. This relies upon observations that patriarchy is deeply embedded in the culture, thus the spotlight is on empowering women who are vulnerable and powerless. Research also suggests that loans given to women tend to more often benefit the whole family than do loans to men.

Having been adopted in one of the U.N.'s Millennium Development Goals, micro credit initiatives have been seen as beneficial for alleviating poverty. While it has been shown to do this, scholars also indicate that in many cases, micro credit loans can worsen poverty. As observed in the context of India's microcredit crisis of 2010, client poaching occurs where the poorest of individuals are given loans, even if they have little to no prospects of repayment. Quick repayment requirements on loans often don't give women enough time to generate the income quickly enough through their business expenditures. Financial setbacks in the initial stages of business, use of loan money for emergencies and/or day-to-day consumption can result in large indebtedness and conditions of poverty worse than before. Thus, collateral takes the form as scholar Lamia Karim coins, the economy of shame. In Bangladesh, women are the traditional custodians of honour. Deferral on these loans puts the honour of the family and the security of the woman at risk, thus making shame and humiliation collateral for micro credit institutions.

Another disadvantage to women in micro finance is credit control. While intended for women, husbands in the family often end up being the sole beneficiaries of the capital. The idea that "since my wife belongs to me, than so does the money" is largely the reason for this.

Garment industry

The garment sector in Bangladesh accounts for 77% of total exports, as well as being the country's largest industry. Low wages and poor commitment to Bangladesh's labour laws have provided the basis for extremely competitive labour costs. Unmarried women from rural areas are the preferred garment factory workers, and correspondingly make up the majority of the labour force. Women are preferred over men primarily because its deemed a) women are more patient and nimble b) women are more controllable than men c) women are less mobile and less likely to join a trade union d) women can do better in sewing because it coincides with domestic jobs.

Garment workers experience several violations of worker rights which are supposedly protected in Bangladesh's labour codes. Among these violations are long working hours, illegal pay deductions, lack of safe and sanitary working conditions and denial of freedom to associate and bargain collectively. Harassment and abuse against workers is also extremely prevalent in Bangladesh.

Working conditions are different for women than men because they work different jobs. Generally, women suffer the worst working conditions because they hold low skill jobs where occupational hazards are greater. Health is adversely affected by long working hours and poor ventilation. Garment workers also often suffer from the absence of a lunchroom and clean drinking water. Safety and fire hazards are issues as well; in April 2013, a factory collapse on the outskirts of Dhaka killed 1,021 people.

Female workers deal with other issues male workers don't need to. Female garment workers can face an uncongenial work environment, unsafe transportation, and housing. These factors generally don't affect male workers. Sexual harassment and violence in the workplace are also common. In 1998, 161 rape cases in and around garment factories were reported by the Department of Metropolitan Police in Dhaka.

Despite these negative aspects, the garment industry to many Bangladeshi women represents one of few options to work with dignity. The industry allows for women, in many cases, to become the bread winners for their families as well as having elevation in social status. In the International People's Health Assembly held in Bangladesh in 2000, voices of women spoke out against the threat of imposing international labour standards threatening their garment industry jobs.

Political participation

Since the 1990s, women have become increasingly influential in the political arena. Despite the barriers that come with patriarchal rules and the purdah, the system of quotas has ensured women's representation in the national parliament and local governments. Since 1991, all the prime minister elections have been won by two female prime ministers, Sheikh Hasina and Khaleda Zia. Elections in December 2008 resulted in the election of Hasina, who is currently serving.

Despite these successes, there remain several factors that limit women's political participation. The political culture based on vengeance, distrust and corruption has ideological, political, religious and institutional dimensions that are rooted in the whole of society. The result is an institutionalisation of violence as a means of political expression. In 2007, 192 cases of women being attacked with acid were registered. Intimidation by conservative parties and religious and socio-cultural norms are used to cut down and intimidate women, limiting their rights to vote. High rates of illiteracy have also acted as limiting factors.

Inequality and violence against women

Cultural and traditional factors heavily influence how women are treated and regarded in Bangladesh. Once married, women, adolescents, and girls become property of the husbands family. This limits opportunities for schooling, thus perpetuating dependence and disempowerment. Domestic violence and discrimination are difficult to measure, acts of violence can be accounted for in court proceedings and police reports. Violence in Bangladesh ranges from acid throwing, physical and psychological torture, sexual harassment, sexual assault, rape, related violence, trafficking, forced prostitution, coerced suicide and murder.

Rape

Rape is one of the most brutal forms of violence against women in Bangladesh, and its on the rise. Data from the BNWLA Resource centre shows that rape cases doubled from 564 in 2001 to 1043 in 2004. Gang rape has become increasingly prevalent as well.

Domestic violence

Domestic violence incidents in Bangladesh are widespread and fairly common, affecting women across all forms of economic strata. While largely under-reported due to social stigma and fear, data suggests an increase in reported cases of abuse. In 2001, 530 domestic abuse cases were reported in Bangladeshi newspapers. In 2004, the number of cases reported more than doubled that number at 1164 cases. Despite this, domestic violence is not seen as a serious crime. Because it is often regarded as family matters, law enforcement agencies may be reluctant to get involved.

Acid violence

Acid violence against women has become popular act of revenge since the 1980s. Bangladesh has the highest worldwide incidents of acid crimes, accounting for 9% of burn injuries in the country. A recent study reveals that land disputes account for 27% of acid attacks, followed by 18% for family disputes, 10% for refusal of sex, 8% for refusal of romantic relationship, 5% for dowry conflicts, 4% for marital disputes, 3% for refusal of marriage proposal, 2% for political enmity, and the remaining 23% for unknown reasons. Despite new harsh laws, acid violence has been increasing over the last few years. Statistics do not fully capture the devastating effects of acid violence. The plight for victims goes beyond physical scarring, daily life is forever marked by stigma, harassment, and destitution.

References

External links

Bangladesh
Society of Bangladesh
Sexism in Bangladesh